Ernst Pedersen (born 8 October 1935) is a Danish former sports shooter. He competed at the 1968 Summer Olympics and the 1976 Summer Olympics.

References

External links
 

1935 births
Living people
Danish male sport shooters
Olympic shooters of Denmark
Shooters at the 1968 Summer Olympics
Shooters at the 1976 Summer Olympics
People from Slagelse
Sportspeople from Region Zealand